Uranium Corporation of India (UCIL) is a public sector undertaking (PSU), under the Department of Atomic Energy for uranium mining and processing. The corporation was founded in 1967 and is responsible for the mining and milling of uranium ore in India. The firm operates mines at Jadugora, Bhatin, Narwapahar, Turamdih and Banduhurang

Mines

Jaduguda 
It is the first uranium mine of India which started its operations in 1967. This mine is located in the state of Jharkhand. Jadugoda process plant is located close to the mine which is used for the processing of the uranium ore. The ore from Bhatin and Narwapahar mines is also processed here.

Bhatin
This mine is located 3 km away from Jaduguda and shares most of the infrastructure with the Jaduguda mine.

Narwapahar
This mine was commissioned in April 1995. It is known to be the most modern mine of the country.

Turamdih
Turamdih mine is located 24 km to the west of Jaduguda and five km south to Tatanagar railway station which is on howrah Mumbai main line. It was commissioned in 2003. Turamdih Processing Plant has been set up to treat the ore from Turamdih, Banduharang and Mohuldin mines.

Bagjata
Bagjata Mines is an underground mine in east singhbhum district of Jharkhand.

New projects
UCIL has taken up activities to start two underground mines in Jharkhand. Uranium reserves have been found in the state of Andhra Pradesh and the construction of an underground mine has started in Cuddapah district.

Controversies
There was criticism from certain sections of the local community that the mining operations of UCIL were resulting in harmful radiation to the public.
UCIL was also among the 63 Indian establishments put under sanction by USA in 1998 after Operation Shakti.
The mining activities of UCIL in the Khasi Hills were also fiercely opposed by the local tribals protesting against potential health effects.

References

External links
 Official  Uranium Corporation of India website
 Uranium Corporation of India  at Department of Atomic Energy

Mining companies of India
Nuclear technology in India
Uranium mining
Government-owned companies of India
Non-renewable resource companies established in 1967
Technology companies established in 1967
1967 establishments in Bihar